Bay Street is a prominent street in Savannah, Georgia, United States.

Formerly known as "Bay Street" singular (and originally North Broad Street), it is now denoted as "West Bay Street" and "East Bay Street", the split occurring at Savannah City Hall at the head of Bull Street.

West Bay Street begins in the industrial western side of the city, where it is part of Georgia State Route 25 (before turning south onto Martin Luther King Jr. Boulevard), then continues along the northern end of Savannah's downtown, where it is lined with historic buildings on its southern side and hotels and a park on its northern side, which is at the edge of the bluff.

East of City Hall, the northern side of the street is known as The Strand, punctuated by Emmet Park a few yards west of where East River Street merges with East Bay Street.

Downtown Savannah

Intersections
Bay Street has intersections with the below streets in its downtown section (from west to east):

West Bay Street
Fahm Street (cross street)
Ann Street
Martin Luther King Jr. Boulevard (cross street)
Montgomery Street (cross street)
Jefferson Street
Williamson Street
Barnard Street (including a ramp to River Street through Factors Walk)
Whitaker Street

East Bay Street

Drayton Street
Abercorn Street (including a ramp to River Street)
Lincoln Street (including a ramp to River Street)
Habersham Street
Price Street
Houston Street
Rossiter Place
East Broad Street (including a ramp to River Street)
East River Street

St. Patrick's Day

In March 2001, the crowds attending the annual St. Patrick's Day celebrations in Savannah spilled over onto Bay Street after police closed River Street's festival entrances. This led to the closure of Bay Street to traffic around 11:15 PM out of concern for public safety. The following year, the city made the section of Bay Street between Martin Luther King Jr. Boulevard and Price Street pedestrian-only.

Notable buildings and structures

Below is a selection of notable buildings and structures on Bay Street, all in Savannah's Historic District. From west to east:

Northern side

John Williamson Range, 302–310 West Bay Street (1850)
220–224 West Bay Street (1821)
Lowden Building, 214 West Bay Street (1910)
William Taylor Stores, 202–206 West Bay Street (1806/1818)
Jones and Telfair Range, 112–130 West Bay Street (1852–1854)
Hyatt Regency Savannah, 2 West Bay Street (1980)
Savannah City Hall, 2 East Bay Street (1904–1905)
Thomas Gamble Building, 4–10 East Bay Street (1877)
Upper Stoddard Range, 12–42 East Bay Street (1859)
Savannah Cotton Exchange, 100 East Bay Street (1887)
Claghorn and Cunningham Range, 102–110 East Bay Street (1857)
Jones/Derenne Range, 112–130 East Bay Street (1857)
Archibald Smith Stores, 202–206 East Bay Street (1810)
Lower Stoddard Range, 208–230 East Bay Street (1858)
Scott and Balfour Stores, 302–316 East Bay Street (1858)
George Anderson Stores, 402–410 East Bay Street (1823/1850s)
508 East Bay Street (1892)
Emmet Park
Old Harbor Light (1858)

Southern side

Simon Guckenheimer Building, 225 West Bay Street (1893)
George W. Jones Building, 121–123 West Bay Street (1852)
James Johnston Building, 103 West Bay Street (1819)
21 West Bay Street (former City Hotel) (1821)
Solomon Cohen Building, 17 West Bay Street (1869)
United States Customhouse, 1–3 East Bay Street (1842–1852)
Central Railroad Bank, 7 East Bay Street (1853)
George Owens House, 15–17 East Bay Street (1822–1823)
25–27 East Bay Street (1860/1895/1915)
Hibernia Bank Building, 101 East Bay Street (1914)
105–107 East Bay Street (1922)
Oglethorpe Lodge Building, 113–119 East Bay Street (1853)
Edward Padelford Building (west), 229–233 East Bay Street (1853–1854)
Edward Padelford Building (east), 301 East Bay Street (1851)
Hugh Cullen Property, 3–5 Habersham Street (at Bay Street) (1854)
417 East Bay Street (circa 1875)
John Eppinger Property, 425 East Bay Street (1809)
601 East Bay Street (1860)

References

Roads in Savannah, Georgia
Streets in Georgia (U.S. state)